Plicaturopsis crispa, the crimped gill or crispling, is a saprotrophic species of fungus in the genus  Plicaturopsis that can be found in temperate regions year-round, often on hazel, alder, and beech trees.

The fungus has a wide distribution, having been recorded in Europe, Asia, Australia, and North America. In Britain, its range has been rapidly increasing with 78% of all records of P. crispa in the FRDBI (Fungal Records Database of Britain & Ireland) being from after the year 2000, many of which are in areas with no previous recordings of the species.

Taxonomy
Originally described in 1794 by Persoon as Merulius fagineus, he then reclassified it in 1800 as Merulius crispus. Then, in 1821, Fries proceeded to move it into Cantharellus but later, in 1862, had second thoughts and moved it to Trogia, a genus composed of several tropical species with similar hymenial ridges. 

In 1872, the American mycologist Peck described a new genus Plicatura (from plicate = folded) for the American fungus P. alni. This fungus had already been described in Europe by Fries as Merulius niveus. This caused Karsten to produce the combination Plicatura nivea. Then, in 1922, Carleton Rea abandoned the genus Trogia and moved T. crispa into Plicatura in his book British Basdiomycetae. 

In 1964, Derek Reid emphasized the morphological differences between both of these Plicatura species and erected a new monotypic genus Plicaturopsis for P. crispa.

Molecular findings 
On the basis of a six-gene study, Binder and colleagues (2010) erected a new order called Amylocorticales that confirmed the previous relationships suggested in Eriksson et al (1981). P. crispa undoubtedly belongs within this group and this new order is sister to the Agaricales.

Its worth noting that Merulius, Cantharellus, Trogia, and Plicatura are not closely related as previously thought but are instead from various different orders (Polporales, Cantharellales, Agaricales, and Amylocorticales respectively).

Description

It forms clusters on typically deciduous trees on decomposing branches. Fruit bodies are generally 1-3 cm in length with bracket-like semi-circular shell shapes. Upper surface is normally concentrically zoned getting paler as it approaches the edge. Underside is made up of  pale forked folds, giving a gill-like appearance. It produces white spores which are small, narrow allantoid, weakly amyloid, and only 3–4.5 x 1–1.2 μm.

Ecology
Plicaturopsis crispa is an effective participant in the initial phase of decay, colonizing predominantly dead branches of deciduous trees (Fagus and Betula) and is associated with a white rot. A few years into the succession of wood decomposition, strong competitors such as Trametes versicolor and the split-gill fungus Schizophyllum commune often displace P. crispa.

Gallery

References

Amylocorticiales
Taxa named by Christiaan Hendrik Persoon
Taxa described in 1794
Fungi of Asia
Fungi of Australia
Fungi of Europe
Fungi of North America